Ruth Langer may refer to:

 Ruth Langer (scholar), professor of theology
 Ruth Langer (swimmer) (born 1921), Austrian swimmer